The Uzbekistan national under-23 football team represents Uzbekistan in international U-23 football competitions. The team is controlled by the Uzbekistan Football Association and is a member of the Asian Football Confederation.

Competitive record

Olympic Games

AFC U-23 Asian Cup

Asian Games

Since the 2002 Asian Games the age limit for men's teams is under-23, plus up to three over aged players for each squad.

Results and fixtures

2021

2022

Head-to-head record
, after the match against .

The following table shows Uzbekistan under-23 team's all-time international record.

Managers

 Mirzohim Ghulomov and   Aleksander Ivankov , U22 (1995)
 Viktor Borisov, U22 (1999)
 Viktor Borisov , U22 (2003)
 Rauf Inileev, U23 (2006)
 Vadim Abramov, U22 (2007)
 Akhmad Ubaydullaev, U23 (2010)
 Vadim Abramov, U22- U23 (2011–2012)
 Aleksey Evstafeev , U21–U22 (2012–2013)
 Mirjalol Qosimov, U23 (2014)
 Shukhrat Maqsudov, U22 (2014–2015)
 Bakhtiyor Ashurmatov, U22 (2015)
 Viktor Djalilov, U22 (2015)
 Samvel Babayan , U22–U23 (2015–2016)
 Jasur Abduraimov, U21–U22 (2016–2017)
 Ravshan Khaydarov, U22–U23 (2017–2018)
 Ljubinko Drulović, U22–U23 (2019–2020)
 Timur Kapadze, U23 (since 2021)

Players

Current squad
The following players were called up for the 2022 AFC U-23 Asian Cup.

Previous squads

Asian Games
Football at the 2002 Asian Games squads – Uzbekistan
Football at the 2006 Asian Games squads – Uzbekistan
Football at the 2010 Asian Games squads – Uzbekistan
Football at the 2014 Asian Games squads – Uzbekistan
Football at the 2018 Asian Games squads – Uzbekistan

AFC U-23 Asian Cup
2013 AFC U-22 Championship squads – Uzbekistan
2016 AFC U-23 Championship squads – Uzbekistan
2018 AFC U-23 Championship squads – Uzbekistan
2020 AFC U-23 Championship squads – Uzbekistan
2022 AFC U-23 Asian Cup squads – Uzbekistan

See also
Uzbekistan national under-20 football team
Uzbekistan national under-17 football team
Uzbekistan national football team

References

External links
Uzbekistan Football Federation
                                     

Asian national under-23 association football teams
u23